Miss Nobody may refer to:
 Miss Nobody (1917 film), a silent film drama directed by William Parke
 Miss Nobody (1920 film), an American silent film starring Billie Rhodes
 Miss Nobody (1926 film), an American silent film starring Anna Q. Nilsson
 Miss Nobody (1996 film), aka Panna Nikt, a Polish film
 Miss Nobody (2010 film), an American film starring Leslie Bibb